Montenegrin Ground Army is the ground force of the Armed Forces of Montenegro.

Montenegrin Army
The fundamental role and purpose of the Montenegrin Army is to protect vital national interests of Montenegro and defend the sovereignty and territorial integrity of the state.

Equipment

References

Military of Montenegro
Military units and formations established in 1879
Military units and formations disestablished in 1918
Military units and formations established in 2006